The Voice of Africa may be:

 Voice of Africa Radio, an FM station in London
 Voice of Africa, A24 news channel, broadcasting from Kenya
 Voice of Africa (shortwave), the official Arabic broadcast of the government of Libya, formerly known as Radio Jamahiriya, closed 2011
The Voice of Africa, book by Leo Frobenius
The Voice of Africa (album), by Miriam Makeba
The Voice of Africa (Kelly Khumalo album), by Kelly Khumalo